James Hutton was a Scottish geologist.

James Hutton may also refer to:

 James D. Hutton (c. 1828–1868), American artist, topographer, and pioneer photographer
 James Frederick Hutton (1826–1890), British businessman and colonialist
 James Scott Hutton, first principal of the Halifax School for the Deaf (19th century)
 Jim Hutton (Dana James Hutton) (1934–1979), American actor 
 James Hutton (footballer), Scottish footballer (19th century)